Huang Da (22 February 1925 – 18 February 2023) was a Chinese economist who was the president of Renmin University of China. He is regarded as the founder of modern financial research in China.

Life and career
Huang Da was born in Tianjin to an intellectual family in 1925. He was educated at Huabei Union University (华北联合大学), later Renmin University of China. He was the president of Renmin University of China from 1991 to 1994. He was a founding member of the Monetary Policy Commission of the People's Bank of China, serving from 1997 to 1999.

Huang was especially known for his "four textbooks" in finance - On Socialist Financial Questions (1981, 社会主义财政金融问题), An Introduction to General Finance-Credit Balance (1984, 财政信贷综合平衡导论), Economics of Money and Banking (1992, 货币银行学), and Finance (2004, 金融学).

Huang died on 18 February 2023, four days shy of reaching age 98.

References

External links
 Huang Da's profile at Renmin University of China's website

1925 births
2023 deaths
People's Republic of China economists
Academic staff of Renmin University of China
Presidents of Renmin University of China
Educators from Tianjin
Renmin University of China alumni
People of the Republic of China
Economists from Tianjin